Yuliya Shiryayeva (born 21 July 1994) is a Kazakhstani footballer who plays as a forward and has appeared for the Kazakhstan women's national team.

Career
Shiryayeva has been capped for the Kazakhstan national team, appearing for the team during the 2019 FIFA Women's World Cup qualifying cycle.

References

External links
 
 
 

1994 births
Living people
Kazakhstani women's footballers
Kazakhstan women's international footballers
Women's association football forwards